Harpartap Singh Ajnala (born 7 August 1951) is an Indian politician and a member of INC. Between 2017-2022, Singh represented the Ajnala Assembly constituency as Member of the Legislative Assembly.

Member of the Legislative Assembly 
In the 2017 Punjab Legislative Assembly election, he was elected as the member of the Punjab Legislative Assembly from Ajnala. He won the seat as a candidate of the INC, beating the incumbent member of the Punjab Legislative Assembly Amarpal Singh Ajnala of the SAD by  votes.

In 2022 Punjab Legislative Assembly election he was defeated by Kuldeep Singh Dhaliwal of AAP.

Electoral performance

References

 

 

Living people
Punjab, India MLAs 2017–2022
1951 births
People from Amritsar district
Indian National Congress politicians from Punjab, India